Inge Egger (27 August 1923 – 5 September 1976) was an Austrian stage, television and film actress. She played the female lead in the 1953 operetta film The Rose of Stamboul.

From 1960 to 1973 Inge Egger worked as a medical-technical assistant at the Berlin Federal Health Office. In 1976 she died of cancer in Berlin.

Filmography

References

Bibliography
 Goble, Alan. The Complete Index to Literary Sources in Film. Walter de Gruyter, 1999.

External links
 

1923 births
1976 deaths
Austrian film actresses
Austrian television actresses
Austrian stage actresses
Actors from Linz
20th-century Austrian actresses